The sixteenth series of the Ojarumaru anime series aired from April 1 to November 15, 2013 on NHK for a total of 70 episodes.

The series' opening theme is "Utahito" (詠人), with entirely new animation, by Saburō Kitajima. The ending theme is "Maro no Sanpo" (マロのさんぽ My Walk) by Yuriko Fuchizaki, Chinami Nishimura, and Narumi Satō.

Episodes

References

External links
 Series 16 episode list

Ojarumaru episode lists